North Meath was a UK Parliament constituency in Ireland, returning one Member of Parliament (MP) from 1885 to 1922.

Prior to the 1885 United Kingdom general election the area was part of the Meath constituency. From 1922, on the establishment of the Irish Free State, it was not represented in the UK Parliament.

Boundaries
This constituency comprised the northern part of County Meath.

1885–1922: The baronies of Fore, Kells Lower, Kells Upper, Morgallion, Slane Lower and Slane Upper, that part of the barony of Navan Lower not contained within the constituency of South Meath, and that part of the barony of Skreen contained within the parishes of Ardmulchan and Athlumney.

Members of Parliament

Elections

Elections in the 1880s

Elections in the 1890s

On petition, Davitt was unseated causing a by-election.

Elections in the 1900s

Elections in the 1910s

Sources

Footnotes

Westminster constituencies in County Meath (historic)
Dáil constituencies in the Republic of Ireland (historic)
Constituencies of the Parliament of the United Kingdom established in 1885
Constituencies of the Parliament of the United Kingdom disestablished in 1922